Sheng Kung Hui Tsoi Kung Po Secondary School (TKP) is a secondary school in Homantin, Kowloon, Hong Kong. It is managed by the Anglican (Hong Kong) Secondary Schools Council Limited. This school was founded in 1982. It is a Co-educational secondary School.

Sheng Kung Hui Tsoi Kung Po Secondary School is an Anglican church school. School motto is: "Faithful to God and Charitable to Man." They are committed to providing students with a Christian education that develops students spiritually, morally, intellectually, physically, socially and aesthetically; to instill in them a spirit of self and lifelong learning, a civilized temperament, good character and a sense to serve their families, society, nation and the world.

See also

Education in Hong Kong
List of schools in Hong Kong
Hong Kong

External links

Official Website

Protestant secondary schools in Hong Kong
Secondary schools in Ho Man Tin
Anglican schools in Hong Kong
Educational institutions established in 1982
1982 establishments in Hong Kong